Tivadar Filótás (18 October 1903 – 2 August 1945) was a Hungarian modern pentathlete. He competed at the 1928 Summer Olympics.

References

External links
 

1903 births
1945 deaths
Hungarian male modern pentathletes
Olympic modern pentathletes of Hungary
Modern pentathletes at the 1928 Summer Olympics
Hungarian military personnel of World War II
20th-century Hungarian people